Gary R. Van Bellen (fourth ¼ 1957) is an English  former professional rugby league footballer who played in the 1980s and 1990s.

Background 
Gary Van Bellen's birth was registered in Huddersfield, West Riding of Yorkshire, England.

Playing career

County Cup Final appearances
Gary Van Bellen played left-, i.e. number 11, (replaced by interchange/substitute Dick Jasiewicz) in Bradford Northern's 5-10 defeat by Castleford in the 1981 Yorkshire County Cup Final during the 1981–82 season at Headingley Rugby Stadium, Leeds on Saturday 3 October 1981, and played right-, i.e. number 10, in the 7-18 defeat by Hull F.C. in the 1982 Yorkshire County Cup Final during the 1981–82 season at Elland Road, Leeds on Saturday 2 October 1982.

John Player Trophy Final appearances
Gary Van Bellen played right-, i.e. number 12, (replaced by  interchange/substitute Steve Ferres) in Bradford Northern's 6-0 victory over Widnes in the 1979–80 John Player Trophy Final during the 1979–80 season at Headingley Rugby Stadium, Leeds on Saturday 5 January 1980.

Club career
Gary Van Bellen made his début for Bradford Northern against York at Clarence Street, York, he played, and scored a try in Bradford Northern's 6-11 defeat by Featherstone Rovers in the 1982–83 Challenge Cup semi-final during the 1982–83 season at Headingley Rugby Stadium, Leeds on Saturday 26 March 1983, he made his début for Leigh during the 1984–85 season, he played his last match for Leigh during the 1984–85 season, he made his début for Wakefield Trinity during February 1987, and he played his last match for Wakefield Trinity during the 1988–89 season.

Genealogical information
Gary Van Bellen is the younger brother of Colin J. Van Bellen (birth registered second ¼  in Huddersfield district), and Victor T. Van Bellen (birth registered first ¼  in Huddersfield district), and the rugby league footballer; Ian Van Bellen.

References

External links

Photograph 'Gary Van Bellen in action - Gary Van Bellen in action against Great Britain - 26/08/1984' at rlhp.co.uk
Photograph 'Gary Van Bellen Takes Hit - Gary Van Bellen runs into a tough tackle in today's premiership final against Widnes, which Northern lost by 19pts to 5pts - 17/05/1980' at rlhp.co.uk
Photograph 'The 1981 squad pictured at Odsal - The 1981 squad who retained the Championship. - 01/01/1981' at rlhp.co.uk
Photograph 'Two sent off at Craven Park - Two of the players sent off in the famous walk off game at Craven Park. - 03/05/1982' at rlhp.co.uk
Photograph 'Bradford Northern's Yorkshire Cup squad 1982 - Bradford Northern's Yorkshire Cup Final Squad 1982. - 02/10/1982' at rlhp.co.uk
Photograph 'Northern's Cup semi final squad 1983 - Northern's semi final squad v. Featherstone in 1983. - 26/03/1983' at rlhp.co.uk
Photograph 'First in the sin bin - Gary Van Bellen is the first Northern player to be sent to the sin bin - 09/01/1983' at rlhp.co.uk
Photograph 'Ronnie Firth sprays the champagne- Chairman Ronnie Firth celebrates with the players in the Headingley dressing room after the win against Widnes. - 05/01/1980' at rlhp.co.uk (image upside-down)
Photograph 'Northern celebrate the Championship win - Dressing room shot of Northern's Championship winning team. - 20/04/1981' at rlhp.co.uk
Photograph 'Van Bellen and Millington 'walk'. - Gary Van Bellen and John Millington 'walk' after being sent off by referee Whitfield. - 03/05/1982' at rlhp.co.uk
Photograph 'Gary Van Bellen goes over - Gary Van Bellen goes over for a try in the Semi final v. Featherstone. - 26/03/1983' at rlhp.co.uk

1957 births
Living people
Bradford Bulls players
English rugby league players
Hunslet R.L.F.C. players
Leigh Leopards players
Rugby league players from Huddersfield
Rugby league props
Sheffield Eagles (1984) players
Wakefield Trinity players
Wakefield RFC players